Egerton Smith (19 June 1774 – 18 November 1841) was a Liverpool publisher, founder of the Liverpool Mercury.

Biography

Egerton Smith was the son of Egerton Smith the elder (died 1788) and Ann Prescott. He joined his mother and then his brother in the family firm, making navigational instruments, and took out a patent for one invention in 1809. However, he increasingly turned towards printing and publishing. He founded the Liverpool Mercury newspaper in 1811, and a weekly magazine, The Kaleidoscope, in 1818. Smith was also active in founding mechanics institutes and became a well-known local philanthropist.

He was one of the founders of the Strangers' Friend Society, a local charity which helped the poor at their homes.

Animal welfare

Smith authored an early book supportive of animal welfare. It was first published in an anthology of prose and verse, The Melange, in 1834. It was published separately as  The Elysium of Animals: A Dream in 1836. The Monthly Review for 1836 commented:

Selected publications

The Melange (1834)
The Elysium of Animals: A Dream (1836)

References

Bibliography
Perkin, Michael, 'Egerton Smith and the Early Nineteenth Century Book Trade in Liverpool', in Robin Myers and Michael Harris (eds.) Spreading the Word: the Distribution Networks of Print, 1550-1850 (Winchester, 1990), 151-64

1774 births
1841 deaths
19th-century British newspaper publishers (people)
British animal welfare scholars
British magazine publishers (people)
British scientific instrument makers
Engineers from Liverpool
English philanthropists
Publishers from Liverpool